Sunwapta Peak is a peak located in the Sunwapta River valley of Jasper National Park, just north of the Columbia Icefield in Alberta, Canada. The peak was named in 1892 after the Stoney language word  meaning "turbulent river". The mountain can be seen from the Icefields Parkway (Highway 93).

Routes 

Geology

Sunwapta Peak is composed of sedimentary rock laid down from the Precambrian to Jurassic periods that was pushed east and over the top of younger rock during the Laramide orogeny.

Climate

Based on the Köppen climate classification, Sunwapta Peak is located in a subarctic climate zone with cold, snowy winters, and mild summers. Temperatures can drop below -20 °C with wind chill factors below -30 °C. Precipitation runoff from Sunwapta Peak drains into the Sunwapta River which is a tributary of the Athabasca River.

References

External links
 Parks Canada web site: Jasper National Park

Three-thousanders of Alberta
Mountains of Jasper National Park